Kinwat Assembly constituency is one of the 288 Vidhan Sabha (legislative assembly) constituencies of Maharashtra state, western India. This constituency is located in Nanded district.

Representative of Assembly
2019 = Bhimrao Keram, BJP

2014 = Pradeep Hemsingh Jadhav(Naik), NCP

2009 = Pradeep Hemsingh Jadhav (naik), NCP

2004 = Pradeep Hemsingh Jadhav(Naik), NCP

1999 = Digambar Bapuji Pawar Patil, BJP

1995 = Digambar Bapuji Pawar Patil, BJP

1990 = Subhash limbaji jadhav, CPI

1985 = Pachpute Kishanrao Ghampatrao, INC

1980 = Pachpute Kishanrao Ghampatrao, INC(I)

Geographical scope
As per the 2008 delimitation there are nine assembly constituencies in Nanded district, viz. Kinwat, Hadgaon, Bhokar, Nanded North, Nanded South, Loha, Naigaon, Deglur and Mukhed.
The delimitation of the constituency happened in 2008. It comprises Mahur taluka and Kinwat taluka.

References

Assembly constituencies of Maharashtra
Politics of Nanded district